Arno Hesse (born 1887, date of death unknown) was a German athlete.  He competed in the 1908 Summer Olympics in London. In the 1500 metres, Hesse placed seventh and last in his initial semifinal heat and did not advance to the final.

References

Sources
 
 
 

1887 births
Year of death missing
German male middle-distance runners
Olympic athletes of Germany
Athletes (track and field) at the 1908 Summer Olympics